Ganja is one of the oldest and most commonly used synonyms for marijuana. Its usage in English dates to before 1689. It is also known in Hindi

Etymology

Ganja is borrowed from Hindi/Urdu  (IPA: [ɡaːɲd͡ʒaː]), a name for cannabis, which is derived from Sanskrit , referring to a "powerful preparation from Cannabis sativa". The word was used in Europe as early as 1856, when the British enacted a tax on the "ganja" trade.

One academic source places the date of introduction of ganja in Jamaica at 1845. The term came with 19th century workers whose descendants are now known as Indo-Jamaicans.

Contemporary use of the term ganja

English use
Ganja is the most common term for marijuana in West Indies.

In popular culture 
In 1975, Peter Tosh defended the use of ganja in the song "Legalize It". The hip hop group Cypress Hill revived the term in the United States in 2004 in a song titled "Ganja Bus", followed by other artists, including rapper Eminem, in the 2009 song "Must Be the Ganja".

In other languages
Derivatives of the term are also used as generic words for marijuana in several language, such as Khmer (kanhchhea), Lao (kan sa) and Tiwi.

References

Cannabis
Cannabis culture
English words
Etymologies